Maassenia distincta is a moth of the  family Sphingidae. It is known from Madagascar.

It is similar to Maassania heydeni heydeni but differs in the strongly crenulated outer margins to the forewings. The forewing upperside is also similar to Maassenia heydeni heydeni, but the numerous notched brown transverse bands and lines are more distinct and contrasting with the ground colour. The paler areas are grey. The basal band consists of two dark spots.

References

Macroglossini
Moths described in 1934
Moths of Madagascar
Moths of Africa